54 may refer to: 
 54 (number)
 one of the years 54 BC, AD 54, 1954, 2054
 54 (novel), a 2002 novel by Wu Ming
 Studio 54, a New York City nightclub from 1977 until 1981
 54 (film), a 1998 American drama film about the club
 54 (album), a 2010 album by Metropole Orkest
 "Fifty Four", a song by Karma to Burn from the album Arch Stanton, 2014
 54th Division (disambiguation)
 54th Regiment of Foot (disambiguation)
 54th Infantry (disambiguation)